The men's lyonnaise progressive doubles event in boules sports at the 2001 World Games took place from 17 to 19 August 2001 at the World Games Plaza in Akita, Japan.

Competition format
A total of 6 pairs entered the competition. Best four duets from preliminary round qualifies to the semifinal. From semifinal the best two pairs advances to the final.

Results

Preliminary

Semifinal

Finals

References

External links
 Results on IWGA website

Boules sports at the 2001 World Games